Parker-Smith is a surname. Notable people with the surname include:
Jane Parker-Smith (1950–2020), British classical organist
Johnson Parker-Smith (1882–1926), British Olympic lacrosse player

See also
 James Parker Smith (1854–1929), Scottish barrister and politician
Marjorie Parker Smith (1916–2009), American figure skater
T. Parker Smith (graduated 1888), American business college leader

Compound surnames